Annaleise Carr (born March 12, 1998) of Norfolk County, Ontario, Canada, was the youngest person to swim across Lake Ontario by the "traditional route" on Sunday, August 19, 2012 at the age of 14.

Annaleise had to qualify for this swim which was overseen by the regulated body and supervision of Solo Swims of Ontario. After qualifying and filing the 70 pages of paperwork a date was set August 18, 2012. With Lisa Anderson, her parents, grandparents, great grandparents and crew she was set with a huge flurry of media watching her leave as well as being on the water with her. Annaleise began her swim from Niagara-on-the-Lake(considered one of the world's most difficult open water swims) at 6:17:10 pm on August 18, 2012. She arrived at Marilyn Bell Park in Toronto after swimming for almost 27 hours, touching land at 8:58 pm on August 19, 2012. During her attempt, spectators received updates via live blogs, Twitter, and GPS live tracking.

During her swim Annaleise's fundraising increased to $60,000, $80,000 to over $100,000 after her swim. To date Annaleise has raised over $500,000 for the Children and families at Camp Trillium. At the time of her swim Annaleise was the youngest person to cross Lake Ontario at 14 yrs 158 days and set an international record to be the youngest swimmer to swim continuously in open water for more than 24hrs (24 Hour Club). Annaleise's swim from Niagara-On-The-Lake to Toronto's Marilyn Bell Park when calculated through GPS; Annaleise swum close to 70 km due to being pushed off course due to currents and waves of approx 6 ft high pushing back toward Niagara-on-the-Lake.

Swim across Lake Ontario 

Annaleise began her swim from Niagara-on-the-Lake at 6:17:10 pm on August 18, 2012. She arrived at Marilyn Bell Park in Toronto after swimming for almost 27 hours, touching land at 8:58 pm on August 19, 2012. During her attempt, spectators received updates via live blogs, Twitter, and GPS live tracking. One of Annaleise's goals was to raise $30,000 for a summer camp for children with cancer. By 24 hours into the race, she had raised over $60,000 for the camp. Carr also set a record for being the youngest swimmer to swim in open waters for more than 24 hours By August 22, 2012, almost $140,000 had been raised in her name.

Swim across Lake Erie 

Annaleise further challenged herself along with her admiration and love of the kids at Camp Trillium; she decided once again to raise funds for Camp Trillium (Cancer Camp for Children and their families). She along with her Team and supportive parents and siblings prepared the logistics for the first person to cross central Lake Erie, departing from Erie, Pa to Port Dover, Ontario a swimming distance of approx 75 km. Annaleise tirelessly dedicated her spare time in the months leading up to her swim promoting her swim and her book (see below) at various venues she was invited to as a guest.

On July 25, 2014 Annaleise departed Erie, PA with her water crew swimming towards her destination, Port Dover, Ontario. At approx 5:30am due to high winds, waves and strong Lake Erie currents coming of Long Point; Annaleise touch ground on the tip of Long Point making it her second successful lake crossing. She had swum 22 1/2 hrs and a distance of 42.2 km.

Annaleise was determined to complete her initial goal to swim to Port, Dover Ontario and sticking to her motto "NEVER GIVE UP" she continued her remaining swim on September 1, 2014 from where she left of at Long Point to Port Dover, a distance of 30 km and a time of 12hr 12mins. She was welcomed and cheered by the thousands that attended along with the media that was covering her story.

During her swims across Lake Erie, Annaleise raised approx $230,000 for Camp Trillium; her combined total of her two swims is just under half a million dollars and growing; as she voluntarily attends many functions, engagements and requests to attend various venues as a specials guest.

Book 

Leading up to her Lake Erie swim Annaleise was promoting her book she jointly authored with famed Canadian author Deborah Ellis "Annaleise Carr: How I Conquered Lake Ontario to Help Kids Battling". The book was written to reflect on her growing up as a swimmer and her swim across Lake Ontario; written in a format the struggles and challenges she faced crossing Lake Ontario comparative to the struggles and challenges of a young Cancer patient faces but on a longer term. Annaleise's love for the kids at Camp Trillium and knowing the daily long term challenges they and their families faced pushed her to continue her journey.

Awards and accolades 

World Open Water Swimming Association (WOWSA) Woman of the year in 2012.
Queen Elizabeth II Diamond Jubilee Medal, presented by Canadian Prime Minister Stephen Harper
Ontario Lieutenant Governor's Community Volunteer Pin
2012 & 2014 Ontario Junior Citizen of the Year (first person ever to be named with this honour twice)
2012 Canadian Sport Awards Spirit of Sport Story of the Year
2012 Inductee into the Norfolk County Sports Hall of Recognition
2012 TVO Kids "Super Citizen" Award
 #10 on CTV Kitchener Top 10 Stories of 2012
In the 20 of 2012 on CHCH TV
Finalist for Global Marathon Swimming Awards 2012 Solo Swim of the Year (Female)
Simcoe & District Chamber of Commerce Community Service Award
Rotary International Paul Harris Fellowship
Lions International Melvin Jones Fellowship
2013 Independent Order of Foresters International Fraternal President's Award
2013 Honorary Commissioner of the Inaugural Maple Leaf sports & Entertainment Team Up Challenge
2014 Haldimand/Norfolk Soroptimist "Violet Richardson Award" winner
Named a member of Ripley's Aquarium Canada "Marine Teen" Youth Advisory Council
2014 Dr. Brian Luke Spirit of Trillium Award
Presented the Peace Tower Canadian Flag from September 1, 2014 by Minister Diane Findley MP on behalf of PM Stephen Harper

Notes 

Trinity Arsenault became the youngest person to cross Lake Ontario on the "Traditional Route" on August 4, 2014, at 14 years 71 days old. Annaleise was 14 years 158 days old when she broke the previous record. Natalie Lambert at 14 years, 27 days in 2007 completed a 54 km crossing in 23:15 on a more easterly route surrounded by islands in the Kingston, ON area.

References 

1998 births
Living people
People from Norfolk County, Ontario
Canadian female long-distance swimmers